Luis Amilcar Cetino Perez and Tomas Cerrate Hernandez were two Guatemalan men convicted of murder. They were both executed on June 30, 2000. Their execution was televised on Guatemalan television. Cetino was 35 and Cerrate was 39. The executions, both by lethal injection, occurred at Pavon Prison in Fraijanes. In January 1996 both men had kidnapped 80-year old Isabel Bonifassi de Botran, who died as a result. The two stated that they were innocent.

Around the time of the execution President of Guatemala Alfonso Portillo sent his family to Canada to protect them from possible retaliation; the two perpetrators were members of a well-known kidnapping gang.

See also
 Capital punishment in Guatemala
Other executions:
 Manuel Martínez Coronado
 Roberto Girón and Pedro Castillo

Notes

External links
"GUATEMALA: KIDNAPPERS KILLED BY LETHAL INJECTION." Associated Press.

June 2000 events in North America
2000 in Guatemala